The textile industry of Yorkshire after 1835 was based principally on wool, but many of the early cotton mills were based in the county and the assets and spinning machines often switched from cotton to wool. Towns like Keighley and Todmorden owe their expansion to cotton.

Bradford

 
|}

Huddersfield

Leeds

Todmorden

Lonsdale

Airedale

Swaledale

Ribblesdale

Washburn Valley

References
Notes

Bibliography

.
.Yorkshire
Mills in Yorkshire
Cotton
Yorkshire,cotton
Yorkshire,cotton